Hot Lead and Cold Feet (originally titled Welcome to Bloodshy) is a 1978 American comedy-Western film produced by Walt Disney Productions and starring Jim Dale, Karen Valentine, Don Knotts, Jack Elam and Darren McGavin.

It was released on July 5, 1978, by Buena Vista Distribution on a  double feature with The Madcap Adventures of Mr. Toad, a re-titled reissue of the 1949 animated featurette The Wind in the Willows (from The Adventures of Ichabod and Mr. Toad).

Plot

Jasper Bloodshy (Jim Dale) runs the rough-and-tumble town of Bloodshy—named after him because he founded it—which lives in fear of Jasper's gunslinging son Wild Billy (also played by Dale). Jasper has just found out he has another son named Eli (again, played by Dale), who lives in Philadelphia.

It turns out that years ago, Jasper's crazy ways were too much for his bride from England, so she left—leaving behind one twin—and returned to England. With the help of his English butler Mansfield, he writes a new will that mentions Eli, then fakes his death by pretending to fall off a cliff in front of Bloodshy's corrupt mayor Ragsdale (McGavin) and sheriff Denver Kid (Knotts), both of whom he has just told about his second son.

Eli turns out to be the opposite of Wild Billy. He works as a Salvation Army missionary in Philadelphia with orphans named Roxanne (Debbie Lytton) and Marcus (Michael Sharrett). When Eli receives a telegram informing him about his father's death, a father that he did not know existed, he decides to accept the invitation to come to Bloodshy for his inheritance, bringing Marcus and Roxanne with him.

Their stagecoach is held up by the Snead brothers, a group of outlaws that Ragsdale has sent to run off Eli. Unfortunately, nobody was told that Jasper's other son was a twin, so they mistake Eli for Wild Billy (the first of many to mistake the two brothers for one another). The Sneads return to Bloodshy, but cause the stagecoach to run off, leaving Eli, Marcus and Roxanne stranded. On their way to Bloodshy (by foot), they meet a woman named Jenny (Valentine) who is also headed for Bloodshy to start a school. They head for the town together.

Mansfield brings the will to Sheriff Denver to deliver to Ragsdale. From there, it is learned that a contest is involved in the inheritance. The contest is a miles-long obstacle course known as the Bloody Bloodshy Trail that involves operating train engines, crossing a gorge using a rope, climbing a mountain and driving a wagon.

During the contest both Eli and Billy realize that Ragsdale has set them up to kill each other so that he would collect the entire fortune. Both brothers make up and expose Ragsdale for what he really is. Soon after, Ragsdale is imprisoned and Denver Kid becomes the new mayor.

Cast

 Jim Dale as Jasper/Wild Billy/Eli Bloodshy
 Karen Valentine as Jenny, a teacher
 Don Knotts as Sheriff Denver Kid
 Darren McGavin as Mayor Ragsdale
 Jack Elam as Rattlesnake
 Dallas McKennon as Saloon Man
 John Williams as Mansfield
 Warren Vanders as Boss Snead
 Debbie Lytton as Roxanne
 Michael Sharrett as Marcus
 David Cass as Jack
 Richard Wright as Pete
 Don "Red" Barry as Bartender
 Jimmy Van Patten as Jake
 Gregg Palmer as Jeff
 Ed Bakey as Joshua
 John Steadman as Old Codger 
 Eric Server as Cowboy 
 Paul Lukather as Cowboy 
 Hap Lawrence as Cowboy 
 Robert Rothwell as Cowboy 
 Terry Nichols as Prisoner 
 Stanley Clements as Saloon Man 
 Don Brodie as Saloon Man 
 Warde Donovan as Saloon Man 
 Ron Honthaner as Saloon Man 
 Norland Benson as Farmer 
 Jack Bender as Farmer
 Jim Whitecloud as Indian Chief
 Brad Weston as Indian 
 Russ Fast as Official 
 Mike Howden as Official 
 Art Burke as Official
 James Michaelford as Dead-Eye

References

External links
 
 
 
 
 

1978 films
1970s Western (genre) comedy films
Walt Disney Pictures films
American Western (genre) comedy films
1970s English-language films
Films directed by Robert Butler
Films produced by Ron W. Miller
Films scored by Buddy Baker (composer)
1978 comedy films
1970s American films